Melissa K. Nelson Ph.D. is Anishinaabe/Métis/Norwegian and an enrolled citizen of the Turtle Mountain Band of Chippewa Indians. AnIndigenous scholar and activist, she has been part of various activist groups that focus on Indigenous food sovereignty such as The Cultural Conservancy and Bioneers.

Life and education 
Nelson earned her B.A. in Ecology with a focus in Ecophilosophy from The University of California, Santa Cruz, and her Ph.D. in Native American Environmental Studies from The University of California at Davis. She is an Indigenous scholar and activist as well as a cultural ecologist, writer, and media-maker. She has spent more than 20 years as part of the Native American food movement and has been an international Indigenous food sovereignty activist since 2006.

Career 
Nelson is currently "the President of the Cultural Conservancy, an organization in San Francisco that works to protect and restore Indigenous cultures,"  a position she has held since 1993. She is also a professor of American Indian Studies at San Francisco State University where she has worked since 2002. Nelson's work has focused on Indigenous food sovereignty, as well as the use of Indigenous knowledge to create a more sustainable food system, an issue that she has close personal ties to as an Anishinaabe/Métis woman herself. Nelson has also worked as a media-maker throughout her career in order to further her reach as an Indigenous rights activist.

Publications 
 The Salt Song Trail: Bringing Creation Back Together. Directed by Esther Figueroa, produced by Melissa Nelson and Philip M. Klasky, Juniroa Productions, 2005.
 Nelson, Melissa K.; Shilling, Dan (2018). Traditional Ecological Knowledge: Learning from Indigenous Practices for Environmental Sustainability. Cambridge University Press. 
 Nelson, Melissa K. (2008). Original Instructions: Indigenous Teachings for a Sustainable Future. Inner Traditions.

References

External links 
 , San Francisco State University
 Bioneers
 The Cultural Conservancy 

Living people
Year of birth missing (living people)
University of California, Davis alumni
University of California, Santa Cruz alumni
Native American activists
Ojibwe people
American Métis people
American ecologists
Women ecologists
San Francisco State University faculty